The 2019 Michigan Tech Huskies football team represented Michigan Tech University as a member of the Great Lakes Intercollegiate Athletic Conference (GLIAC) during the 2019 NCAA Division II football season. Led by third-year head coach Steve Olson, the Huskies  compiled an overall record of 5–5 with a mark of 3–5 in conference play, placing in a three-way tie for fifth in the GLAIC. Michigan Tech played home games at Kearly Stadium in Houghton, Michigan.

Previous season
The Huskies competed in the 2019 season, going 4–6 overall, featuring a win over rival Northern Michigan.

Schedule

Personnel

Coaching staff

References

Michigan Tech
Michigan Tech Huskies football seasons
Michigan Tech Huskies football